Pak or PAK may refer to:

Places
 Pakistan (country code PAK)
 Pak, Afghanistan
 Pak Island, in the Admiralty Islands group of Papua New Guinea
 Pak Tea House, a café in Lahore, Punjab, Pakistan

Arts and entertainment
 PAK (band), an American band
 Perfect All-Kill, a music chart achievement in South Korea
 Pak, Nintendo's sensational spelling of the word "pack" as a name for their game media and accessories:
 Controller Pak, the Nintendo 64's memory card
 Expansion Pak, a RAM add-on for Nintendo 64
 Game Pak, game cartridges designed for early Nintendo systems
 Option Pak, any of a number of special attachments for the Nintendo DS
 Rumble Pak, a haptic feedback  device
 Transfer Pak, a data-transfer device
 Tremor Pak, a third-party Rumble Pak

People
 Pak (Korean surname), or Park
 Pak (creator), formerly Murat Pak, digital artist, cryptocurrency investor, and programmer
 B. J. Pak (born 1974), Korean-American attorney and politician
 Bo Hi Pak (1930–2019), prominent member of the Unification Church
 Gary Pak (born 1952), Asian Hawaiian writer, editor and professor
 Greg Pak (born 1968), American comic book writer and film director
 Igor Pak (born 1971), Russian professor of mathematics at the University of California
 John Pak (born 1998), American professional golfer
 SuChin Pak (born 1976), South Korean-born American television news correspondent
 Ty Pak (born 1938), Korean-born writer and speaker 
 Yangjin Pak, South Korean archaeologist

Science, technology and military
 PAK (file format), used by computers
 Panzerabwehrkanone (Pak or PaK), German anti-tank guns
 p21 activated kinase, any of a family of enzymes
 9mm P.A.K., a firearm cartridge for a non-lethal gas pistol noisemaking gun

Other uses
 Pak Airways, a former Pakistan airline
 Pak language (disambiguation)
 Panhellenic Liberation Movement (ΠΑΚ), a Greek organisation that campaigned against the 1967–1974 military regime
 Kurdistan Freedom Party (Parti Azadi Kurdistan), a Kurdish nationalist militant group
 Privatisation Agency of Kosovo, a government agency

See also
 
 
 Paak (disambiguation)
 Pack (disambiguation)
 Pak Protector, a form of life in the Known Space fictional universe
 Tetra Pak, a food packaging company